Saint Dunod (variously spelled Dinooth, Dinodh, Dinuth and Deynoch) was the first Abbot of Bangor Iscoed of north-east Wales.

Life
Originally a North British chieftain, he was driven by reverses of fortune into Wales, where under the patronage of Cyngen Glodrydd, Prince of Powys, he founded the monastery of Bangor on the Dee. The community at Bangor was very numerous, and the laus perennis was established there. The Triads say there were 2400 monks, who in turn, 100 each hour, sang the Divine Service day and night. It was an important religious centre in the 5th and 6th centuries. The monastery was destroyed in about 613 by the Anglo-Saxon king Æthelfrith of Northumbria after he defeated the Welsh at the Battle of Chester; a number of the monks then transferred to Bardsey Island.

Dunod is best known as being the only Welsh ecclesiastic mentioned by name, in Bede's Historia ecclesiastica gentis Anglorum. Bede states that Dunod (Dunawd) was still abbot of Bangor Iscoed at the time of the second meeting of Augustine of Canterbury with the seven Welsh bishops at 'Augustine's Oak' (possibly Aust in Gloucestershire or Cressage in Shropshire) in 602 or 603. George Cyprian Alston, writing in the Catholic Encyclopedia doubts that Dunod attended the meeting. While it is true that delegates from Bangor attended the conference, Dunod would have been far advanced in years, and the journey from North Wales to the Lower Severn would have been a difficult one for an aged man.

He is often identified with Dunod Fawr ap Pabo Post Prydain, a Brythonic King ruling somewhere in the North of Britain and father of Saint Deiniol, the first Bishop of Bangor in Gwynedd. However, this is chronologically unlikely.

The primary school in Bangor-on-Dee is named in his honour; Ysgol Sant Dunawd.

References

7th-century Christian saints
Welsh abbots
Medieval Welsh saints